Pam Nugent (née Foley) is an Australian Paralympic swimmer. She was studying to be a nurse at Mater Hospital in Townsville, when she became paralysed from the waist down at the age of 19 after her new motorbike crashed over Castle Hill. She took up swimming after the accident to strengthen her arms. At the 1972 Heidelberg Paralympics, she won two silver medals in the Women's 25 m Freestyle 2 and Women's 3x25 m Medley 2 events. She has been married to Paralympic athlete and wheelchair manufacturer Mike Nugent since 1975.

References

Female Paralympic swimmers of Australia
Swimmers at the 1972 Summer Paralympics
Medalists at the 1972 Summer Paralympics
Paralympic medalists in swimming
Paralympic silver medalists for Australia
Australian female freestyle swimmers
Wheelchair category Paralympic competitors
People with paraplegia
20th-century Australian women
Year of birth missing (living people)
Living people